Xinye is one of the counties of Nanyang that lies in the southwest of Henan province, China. To the south lies the prefecture-level city of Xiangyang in Hubei province, to the east is Tanghe County and to the west is the county-level city of Dengzhou.

The G55 Erenhot–Guangzhou Expressway runs through Waizi town, which is the northmost town of Xinye.

History

Near the end of the Han Dynasty, the warlord Liu Bei used Xinye as a base, as a vassal under Liu Biao. Liu Biao himself had been residing in Xiangyang (today's Xiangfan). Liu Bei lost Xinye to Cao Cao in 208 and retreated to the southeast in prelude to the battle of the Red Cliffs.

Administrative divisions
As 2012, this county is divided to 2 subdistricts, 8 towns and 5 townships.
Subdistricts
Hanhua Subdistrict
Hancheng Subdistrict

Towns

Townships

Climate

References

 
County-level divisions of Henan
Nanyang, Henan